Amy Okuda is an American actress. She portrayed Julia Sasaki on the Netflix comedy-drama Atypical (2017–2021), where she was a series regular during the first two seasons. Okuda is most well-known as Tinkerballa in the popular web series The Guild.

Early life 
Okuda was born in Torrance, California. Her early years focused on basketball, which she played from the age of five. She began dancing in the seventh grade and took up acting a few years later.

Career 
She has appeared in television commercials and music videos as a dancer. She has modeled in print ads for Apple laptops and Verizon, has been in commercials for Shoe Carnival and Japanese soft-drink company Suntory, and done voice-over work for AT&T. 

In 2007, she landed a role in the TV show Californication with David Duchovny. Also in 2007, Okuda got the role of Tinkerballa in The Guild, her first recurring role. As of the end of season four, she has been in all of the show's episodes, with the exception of a few Season 3 episodes where her character was mentioned but not seen.

In 2010, she appeared in a short educational film about the Spitzer Space Telescope. While flying to Saturn, she observes a giant ring newly discovered in 2009 by NASA's Spitzer Space Telescope.

In 2011, she appeared in the Break.com original music video "Tonight, I'm Frakking You" which is a science fiction and video game parody of the song "Tonight (I'm Lovin' You)" by Enrique Iglesias. In the video, she appears along with Alessandra Torresani, Kunal Nayyar, and Matthew Brown.

In November 2011, she was cast in a horror-social satire film titled Chastity Bites. She plays queen bee "mean girl" Ashley Thorne.

In June 2012, she played Samantha in the YouTube channel YOMYOMF's series BFFs. Later that month, Amy played a recurring role in the web series Away We Happened on the YouTube channel Wong Fu Productions. The film starred Jen Chae and Victor Kim.

In April 2013, she appeared in the episode "The Bachelor" of The Middle (season 4, episode 19) as Sue's Tennis opponent, and on the Tabletop web series.

On March 25, 2014, she appeared in Brooklyn Nine-Nine'''s season finale "Charges and Specs" (season 1, episode 22) as Sgt. Terry Jeffords' former girlfriend. She reprised the role in two later episodes. 2014 starred in José Manuel Cravioto Horror thriller film Reversal, along Keith Johnson and Bianca Malinowski.

In 2015, she appeared in Season 2 of Shonda Rhimes' television drama series How To Get Away With Murder on ABC. Okuda also appeared as Christine Tanaka in two episodes of the television series adapted from Philip K. Dick's novel The Man in the High Castle.

In 2016, Okuda was cast as Julia Sasaki in the Netflix comedy television series Atypical'', which debuted on August 11, 2017.

Personal life 
On November 3, 2018, Okuda married fiancé Mitchell Hashimoto.

Filmography

Film

Television

References

External links

20th-century American actresses
Actresses from California
American female dancers
Dancers from California
American television actresses
Living people
American web series actresses
21st-century American actresses
Actors from Torrance, California
American actresses of Japanese descent
Twitch (service) streamers
Year of birth missing (living people)